The Handball events at the 1982 Asian Games were held in New Delhi, India between 19 November and 4 December 1982. The competition included only men's event.

Medalists

Results

Main round

Group A

Group B

Classification 5th–8th

Placement 7–8

Placement 5–6

Final round

Semifinals

Bronze medal match

Gold medal match

Final standing

References

 Results

 
1982 Asian Games events
1982
Asian Games
International handball competitions hosted by India